Central Honiara is a single-member constituency of the National Parliament of Solomon Islands. Established in 1997 when the Parliament was increased in size from 47 to 50 seats, it is located in the capital city Honiara.

List of MPs

Election results

2014

2010

2006

2001

1997

References

Solomon Islands parliamentary constituencies
1997 establishments in the Solomon Islands
Constituencies established in 1997